is a Japanese football player for Kataller Toyama.

Career
After rising through Kataller Toyama youth ranks, Nishi was promoted to the top team in December 2016.

Club statistics
Updated to 29 August 2018.

References

External links

Profile at J. League
Profile at Kataller Toyama

1998 births
Living people
Association football people from Toyama Prefecture
Japanese footballers
J3 League players
Kataller Toyama players
Association football forwards